Tigrillos Medellín Basket Club (in English: Medellín Tigers Basketball Club) is a Colombian basketball club based in Medellín. They play in the Baloncesto Profesional Colombiano, the top level league in Colombia. Founded in 2012 as Academia de la Montaña, home games are played in the Coliseo Iván de Bedout.

Tigrillos had its best season in 2016-I, when they won their first national championship.

History 
The team was founded on November 30, 2012, and entered the league in the 2013-I season and was among the six best teams of the leagues. In the following 2013-II season, they played in the Grand Final.

Three years later, in the 2016-I season, Academia de la Montaña won their first national championship.

In 2020, the team name was changed to Tigrillos Medellín.

In the 2021-I season, Tigrillos reached its second Grand Final and lost to Titanes de Barranquilla.

Honours 
Baloncesto Profesional Colombiano

 Champions (1): 2016-I
 Runners-up (2): 2013-II, 2021-I

References

External links 

 Twitter

Basketball teams in Colombia
Sport in Medellín
Basketball teams established in 2012